The 2013 United States Mixed Doubles Curling Championship was held from December 6–9, 2012 at the Capital Curling Club in Bismarck, North Dakota. Maureen Stolt and her husband Peter Stolt won the tournament, earning the right to represent the United States at the 2013 World Mixed Doubles Curling Championship in Fredericton, New Brunswick.

Teams 
Seventeen teams qualified to compete in the championship.

Round robin

Standings

The 17 teams were split into three pools; each pool played a round robin and at the end the top two teams advanced to the playoffs. The standings at the end of the round robin phase were:

Tiebreakers
Saturday, December 8, 8:00pm CT

Pool A

Pool C

Playoffs 
The playoffs consisted of a 6-team bracket with the top two teams receiving byes in the quarterfinals.

Bracket

Quarterfinals 
Sunday, December 9, 9:00am CT

Semifinals 
Sunday, December 9, 1:00pm CT

Finals 
Sunday, December 9, 5:00pm CT

References

United States National Curling Championships
Curling competitions in Bismarck, North Dakota
United States Mixed Doubles Championship
United States Mixed Doubles Curling Championship
United States Mixed Doubles Curling Championship
United States